Strategic geography is concerned with the control of, or access to, spatial areas that affect the security and prosperity of nations. Spatial areas that concern strategic geography change with human needs and development. This field is a subset of human geography, itself a subset of the more general study of geography.  It is also related to geostrategy.

Strategic geography is that branch of science, which deals with the study of spatial areas that affect the security and prosperity of a nation.

See also 
 Geostrategy

Further reading

Brzezinski, Zbigniew.  The Grand Chessboard: American Primacy and its Geostrategic Imperatives.  New York: Basic Books, 1997.
Daclon, Corrado Maria.  Geopolitics of Environment, A Wider Approach to the Global Challenges.  Italy: Comunità Internazionale, SIOI, 2007.
 Faringdon, Hugh. Strategic Geography: NATO, the Warsaw Pact, and the Superpowers.  Routledge (1989). .
Gray, Colin S. and Geoffrey Sloan.  Geopolitics, Geography and Strategy.  Portland, OR: Frank Cass, 1999.
Kemp G., Harkavy R. Strategic Geography and the changing Middle East. Carnegie Endowment for International Peace in cooperation with Brookings Institution Press, 1997.
Mackinder, Halford J.  Democratic Ideals and Reality.  Washington, DC: National Defense University Press, 1996.
 Stürmer, Michael. Strategische Geografie. Leitartikel, Die Welt Online, 10. February 2004.

External links
European Geostrategy

Geopolitics
Human geography
International security